James Thiessen (born 10 February 1974) is a former Australian rules footballer who played for the Richmond Football Club and Adelaide Football Club in the Australian Football League (AFL), as well as Norwood Football Club in the South Australian National Football League (SANFL). His father Tony had played league football three decades earlier.

Playing mainly on the wing, Thiessen started his AFL career at Richmond in 1993, debuting in a 139-point loss to his future club , but was delisted after just one season. He spent the next four years with Norwood in the SANFL, playing in their 1997 premiership side and also winning a Fos Williams Medal that year for his performance for South Australia in an interstate match against the ACT.

Thiessen was recruited by the Adelaide Crows for the 1998 season and played in their winning Grand Final that year against North Melbourne. He remained with them for two more seasons before returning to Norwood.

Playing statistics

|- style="background-color: #EAEAEA"
! scope="row" style="text-align:center" | 1993
|style="text-align:center;"|
| 46 || 7 || 3 || 8 || 83 || 34 || 117 || 21 || 4 || 0.4 || 1.1 || 11.9 || 4.9 || 16.7 || 3.0 || 0.6
|-
! scope="row" style="text-align:center;" | 1998
|style="text-align:center;"|
| 29 || 24 || 8 || 13 || 217 || 104 || 321 || 64 || 34 || 0.3 || 0.5 || 9.0 || 4.3 || 13.4 || 2.7 || 1.4
|- style="background:#eaeaea;"
! scope="row" style="text-align:center" | 1999
|style="text-align:center;"|
| 29 || 18 || 13 || 8 || 160 || 84 || 244 || 62 || 19 || 0.7 || 0.4 || 8.9 || 4.7 || 13.6 || 3.4 || 1.1
|-
! scope="row" style="text-align:center" | 2000
|style="text-align:center;"|
| 29 || 2 || 0 || 0 || 1 || 4 || 5 || 1 || 1 || 0.0 || 0.0 || 0.5 || 2.0 || 2.5 || 0.5 || 0.5
|- class="sortbottom"
! colspan=3| Career
! 51
! 24
! 29
! 461
! 226
! 687
! 148
! 58
! 0.5
! 0.6
! 9.0
! 4.4
! 13.5
! 2.9
! 1.1
|}

References

External links

James Thiessen profile

1974 births
Living people
Richmond Football Club players
Adelaide Football Club players
Adelaide Football Club Premiership players
Norwood Football Club players
People educated at Haileybury (Melbourne)
Australian rules footballers from Victoria (Australia)
One-time VFL/AFL Premiership players